Daily Kos is a group blog and internet forum focused on the U.S. Democratic Party and liberal American politics. The site includes glossaries and other content. It is sometimes considered an example of "netroots" activism.

Daily Kos was founded in 2002 by Markos Moulitsas and takes the name Kos from the last syllable of his first name, his nickname while in the military.

Organization overview

Funding 
According to Daily Kos, its finances are sustained through lead generation, sponsored content, fundraising, and donations from readers and supporters who have signed up to receive joint petition emails from Daily Kos.

During the 2020 COVID-19 pandemic, the Kos Media received between $1 million and $2 million in federally-backed small business loans from Newtek Small Business Finance as part of the Paycheck Protection Program. The organization said it would help them retain 86 employees.

Viewership and reception 
As of September 2014, Daily Kos has had an average weekday traffic of hundreds of thousands.

In 2008, Time magazine readers named Daily Kos the second best blog. In 2009, Time listed Daily Kos in its "Most Overrated Blogs" section due to the loss of its mission, fighting the "oppressive and war-crazed" Republican administration, during Democrat Barack Obama's presidency. The website ran on the Scoop content management system until 2011 when it moved to its own custom content management system referred to as "DK 4.0". In 2016 and 2017, the Trump presidency brought out huge support for the blog, with more than half a million in direct donations being received from their email campaigns.

In an October 2018 Simmons Research survey of 38 news organizations, the Daily Kos was ranked the fifth least trusted news organization by Americans in a tie with Breitbart News, with the Palmer Report, Occupy Democrats, InfoWars and The Daily Caller being lower-ranked.

Daily Kos has been classified as left-leaning and far-left.

Polling 
Daily Kos had previously partnered with Research 2000 to produce polling for presidential, congressional and gubernatorial races across the country. In June 2010, Daily Kos terminated the relationship after finding that the data showed statistical anomalies consistent with deliberate falsification and announced its intention to sue the polling firm.

On November 30, 2010, an agreement to a settlement began as lawyers for the Plaintiff filed a status report indicating that both parties were "in agreement as to the contours of a proper settlement but are still in the process of determining whether the execution of the proposed terms is feasible". In May 2011, The Huffington Post reported that Research 2000 pollster Del Ali agreed to settle the lawsuit and make payments to Daily Kos.

YearlyKos convention 

In June 2006, members of Daily Kos organized the first ever Daily Kos political blogger convention, called YearlyKos, in Las Vegas, Nevada. The event was attended by approximately 1000 bloggers, and featured appearances by prominent Democrats such as Senate Minority Leader Harry Reid, California Senator Barbara Boxer, General Wesley Clark, Governors Mark Warner, Bill Richardson, Tom Vilsack and DNC Chair Howard Dean. The event was widely covered in the traditional media, including Capitol Hill Blue, The Boston Globe and MSNBC. C-SPAN also carried portions of the convention.

Political activity 
In addition to being a blogging, news, and digital media platform, Daily Kos is a political organization. For instance, The New York Times reported that James Thompson, the April 2017 Democratic candidate for the vacant Kansas's 4th congressional district (House) seat in Kansas, "was helped by nearly $150,000 from Daily Kos, ... and some more modest contributions from a group aligned with Senator Bernie Sanders of Vermont". OpenSecrets reported that "the liberal Daily Kos endorsed Thompson and sent out a fundraising plea, which has so far garnered $178,000 in donations, according to its fundraising page."

Daily Kos has endorsed notable Democratic candidates in state and national races, including Hillary Clinton in the run-up for the 2016 U.S. presidential election, and candidate Jon Ossoff, who ran for Georgia's 6th congressional district in its 2017 special election. Ossoff received more than $1 million raised on Daily Kos.

In 2004, the site launched the dKosopedia.  It was a wiki, using the MediaWiki software, and described as "a political encyclopedia ... written from a left/progressive/liberal/Democratic point of view while also attempting to fairly acknowledge the other side's take". It grew to more than 14,000 articles but has since been discontinued.

See also 
 MyDD

References

External links 
 Daily Kos – official website
 Congress Matters
 Mother Talkers
 YearlyKos – the annual convention of the DailyKos community
 Who is Georgia10?– profile from the Chicago Reader
 The Left, Online and Outraged, profile from The Washington Post
 Keynote Address delivered by Howard Dean at Yearly Kos on June 10, 2006
 

2002 establishments in the United States
American political blogs
American political websites
Internet properties established in 2002
Liberalism in the United States
Political Internet forums